Huxley is a city in Story County, Iowa, United States. The population was 4,244 at the time of the 2020 census. It is part of the Ames, Iowa Metropolitan Statistical Area, which is a part of the larger Ames-Boone, Iowa Combined Statistical Area.

History
Huxley was incorporated on August 27, 1902.

Geography
Huxley is located at  (41.895983, -93.602782).

Demographics

2010 census
As of the census of 2010, there were 3,317 people, 1,194 households, and 884 families living in the city. The racial makeup of the city was 95.6% White, 1.0% African American, 0.2% Native American, 0.5% Asian, 1.1% from other races, and 1.7% from two or more races. Hispanic or Latino of any race were 2.2% of the population.

There were 1,194 households, of which 45.0% had children under the age of 18 living with them, 60.2% were married couples living together, 9.6% had a female householder with no husband present, 4.2% had a male householder with no wife present, and 26.0% were non-families. 20.7% of all households were made up of individuals, and 7.7% had someone living alone who was 65 years of age or older. The average household size was 2.78 and the average family size was 3.25.

The median age in the city was 31.2 years. 34.1% of residents were under the age of 18; 7.2% were between the ages of 18 and 24; 29.4% were from 25 to 44; 20.4% were from 45 to 64; and 9% were 65 years of age or older. The gender makeup of the city was 48.6% male and 51.4% female.

2000 census
As of the census of 2000, there were 2,316 people, 917 households, and 631 families living in the city. The racial makeup of the city was 97.41% White, 0.22% African American, 0.30% Native American, 0.56% Asian, 0.65% from other races, and 0.86% from two or more races. Hispanic or Latino of any race were 1.30% of the population.

There were 917 households, out of which 36.8% had children under the age of 18 living with them, 55.1% were married couples living together, 9.3% had a female householder with no husband present, and 31.1% were non-families. 23.8% of all households were made up of individuals, and 8.0% had someone living alone who was 65 years of age or older. The average household size was 2.50 and the average family size was 3.00.

27.2% are under the age of 18, 12.1% from 18 to 24, 30.4% from 25 to 44, 21.7% from 45 to 64, and 8.6% who were 65 years of age or older. The median age was 32 years. For every 100 females, there were 93.8 males. For every 100 females age 18 and over, there were 93.0 males.

The median income for a household in the city was $48,068, and the median income for a family was $56,202. Males had a median income of $37,736 versus $29,013 for females. The per capita income for the city was $20,172. About 3.5% of families and 6.8% of the population were below the poverty line, including 5.3% of those under age 18 and 3.9% of those age 65 or over.

Arts and culture
Huxley hosts the annual Prairie Festival.

Education
Huxley is part of the Ballard Community School District.

Cultural references
Huxley is the home town of the fictional Riley Finn in the television series Buffy the Vampire Slayer.

References

External links

 
City of Huxley, Iowa Website
City-Data Comprehensive Statistical Data and more about Huxley

Cities in Iowa
Cities in Story County, Iowa
1902 establishments in Iowa